Amphiodon effusus is a species of flowering plant in the family Fabaceae. It is found in non-flooded areas of the Amazon rainforest. It is the only member of the genus Amphiodon.

References

Brongniartieae
Monotypic Fabaceae genera